The 2021–22 Moldovan Under-19 Division was the Moldovan annual football tournament. The season started on 12 September 2021 and ended on 29 May 2022.

Stadia and locations

Squads
Players must be born on or after 1 January 2004, with a maximum of five players per team born between 1 January 2003 and 31 December 2003 allowed.

League table
The six clubs played each other four times for a total of 20 matches per team.

Results 
Matches 1−10

Matches 11−20

References

2021–22 in Moldovan football